Chillagoe Airport  is an airport located  north of Chillagoe, Queensland, Australia.

See also
 List of airports in Queensland

References

Airports in Queensland